Rodolfo Magín Casamiquela (December 11, 1932 in Ingeniero Jacobacci, Río Negro Province – December 5, 2008 in Cipolletti, Río Negro) was an Argentinian paleontologist, archeologist, historian, writer, and teacher, best known for his discovering of the dinosaur Pisanosaurus mertii in 1967.

Awards
Konex Platino (2006)

Honors
Casamiquela is commemorated in the scientific name of a species of lizard, Liolaemus casamiquelai.

Books 
Casamiquela published over 20 books and various reports. This list contains some of them (all in Spanish): 
Sobre la significación mágica del arte rupestre nordpatagónico (1960)
Estudio de Nillatum y la religión araucana (1964)
Rectificaciones y ratificaciones hacia una interpretación definitiva del panorama etnológico de la Patagonia y área septentrional adyacente (1965)
Noticias sobre una breve expedición arqueológica a la zona de Lihuel Calel (provincia de la Pampa) y observaciones complementarias (1967)
En pos del gualicho (1988)
El otro lado de los viajes (1993)
Toponimia indígena de la provincia de La Pampa (2005)
Los ríos mesetarios norpatagónicos: aguas generosas del Ande al Atlántico (2010, publicación póstuma, con varios autores)

References

External links
Obituary of Dr. Rodolfo Casamiquela in Revista de la Asociación Geológica Argentina. (in Spanish).

1932 births
2008 deaths
People from Río Negro Province
Argentine people of Catalan descent
Argentine paleontologists
20th-century Argentine historians
20th-century Argentine male writers
Male non-fiction writers